Valery Yanchy (born 23 June 1977), also spelled Yanchi, is a Belarusian boxer.

Yanchy is the former European Boxing Union flyweight champion.

He also fought for the European Boxing Union bantamweight title, but lost.

References

External links 

1977 births
Living people
Belarusian male boxers
Flyweight boxers